Democratic Portugal–China Friendship Association (in Portuguese: Associação Democrática de Amizade Portugal-China) was an organization in Portugal, supporting closer relations between Portugal and People's Republic of China. The general secretary of ADAP-C was Carlos Ricardo. ADAP-C was linked to the Communist Party of Portugal (Marxist-Leninist) (PCP(m-l)).

ADAP-C published Conhecer a China.

People's Republic of China friendship associations
China–Portugal relations